These are the results of the 2016 NACAC Under-23 Championships in Athletics which took place from July 15 to 17 at the Estadio Jorge "Mágico" González in San Salvador, El Salvador.

Men's results

100 meters

Heats – July 15Wind:Heat 1: -2.2 m/s, Heat 2: -2.0 m/s, Heat 3: -2.1 m/s

Final – July 15Wind:-0.9 m/s

200 meters

Heats – July 17Wind:Heat 1: +0.6 m/s, Heat 2: +0.7 m/s, Heat 3: +1.6 m/s

Final – July 17Wind:+0.8 m/s

400 meters

Heats – July 15

Final – July 16

800 meters

Heats – July 16

Final – July 17

1500 meters
July 15

5000 meters
July 16

10,000 meters
July 15

110 meters hurdles
July 16Wind: -0.3 m/s

400 meters hurdles

Heats – July 16

Final – July 17

3000 meters steeplechase
July 17

4 × 100 meters relay
July 16

4 × 400 meters relay
July 17

20,000 meters walk
July 17

High jump
July 17

Pole vault
July 15

Long jump
July 15

Triple jump
July 17

Shot put
July 17

Discus throw
July 15

Hammer throw
July 16

Javelin throw
July 16

Decathlon
July 16–17

Women's results

100 meters

Heats – July 15Wind:Heat 1: -1.2 m/s, Heat 2: -1.6 m/s

Final – July 15Wind:-2.0 m/s

200 meters

Heats – July 17Wind:Heat 1: -0.6 m/s, Heat 2: -0.7 m/s

Final – July 17Wind:+2.6 m/s

400 meters

Heats – July 15

Final – July 16

800 meters
July 17

1500 meters
July 15

5000 meters
July 17

10,000 meters
July 16

100 meters hurdles

Heats – July 16Wind:Heat 1: -0.6 m/s, Heat 2: -0.7 m/s

Final – July 16Wind:-1.5 m/s

400 meters hurdles
July 17

3000 meters steeplechase
July 16

4 × 100 meters relay
July 16

4 × 400 meters relay
July 16

10,000 meters walk
July 17

High jump
July 15

Pole vault
July 16

Long jump
July 17

Triple jump
July 17

Shot put
July 16

Discus throw
July 15

Hammer throw
July 15

Javelin throw
July 17

Heptathlon
July 15–16

References

NACAC Under-23 Championships in Athletics
Events at the NACAC Under-23 Championships in Athletics